Yeung Uk Tsuen or Yeung Uk New Village is a village in the Tai Wo Hau area of Tsuen Wan District, Hong Kong.

Administration
Yeung Uk New Village is a recognized village under the New Territories Small House Policy.

History
Yeung Uk Tsuen, like the nearby villages of Ho Pui Tsuen and Kwan Mun Hau Tsuen, is a resite village.

See also
 Tsuen Wan Sam Tsuen

References

External links

 Delineation of area of existing village Yeung Uk (Tsuen Wan) for election of resident representative (2019 to 2022)

Villages in Tsuen Wan District, Hong Kong